Salzburgarena is a multi-functional hall situated in  Liefering, a district of Salzburg, Austria. It is a venue for concerts, sporting events and due to flexible seating arrangements, there is space for up to 6,700 people. The venue was opened with a concert by the Vienna Philharmonic, conducted by Nikolaus Harnoncourt, on 7 December 2003.

The Salzburgarena has the largest wooden dome of Western Austria and it is directly connected to the Messezentrum Salzburg via an indoor access. Therefore, it is possible to combine these two locations for an event. Every year about 65 events which take place at the Salzburgarena attract more than 100.000 visitors.

Technical data
 Variable capacity up to 6.700 seats
 Total length of the Salzburgarena 118,16 m
 Overall width excl. extension 89,38 m
 Overall width incl. extension 103,34 m
 Gross floor area 21.068,05 m²
 Gross capacity 179.399,11 m³

The Salzburgarena is a Blackbox (without daylight) and free of pillars.

Traffic
The Salzburgarena can be reached with bus no 1 from the main station and from the city centre. The bus goes every 10 minutes and stops directly in front of the main station.

See also
 Messezentrum Salzburg
 List of indoor arenas in Austria

References

External links

 

Buildings and structures in Salzburg
Indoor arenas in Austria
Music venues in Austria
Sports venues in Austria
Tourist attractions in Salzburg